Cullin-2 is a protein that in humans is encoded by the CUL2 gene.

Interactions 

CUL2 has been shown to interact with:

 CAND1, 
 DCUN1D1, 
 RBX1, 
 SAP130, 
 TCEB2  and
 Von Hippel-Lindau tumor suppressor.

References

External links

Further reading